Transgender Europe (TGEU) is a network of different organisations working to combat discrimination against trans people and support trans people rights. It was founded in 2005 in Vienna during the 1st European Transgender Council as "European Transgender Network" and it is currently a registered NGO as "Transgender Europe".

Since 2009, in collaboration with the online magazine "Liminalis", TGEU runs the project "Trans Murder Monitoring" (TMM) that records the many people who every year around the world are killed as result of anti-trans violence.

History
TGEU was established on the first European Transgender Council in Vienna in November 2005 and formally registered as an Austrian charitable organisation 14 months later. Run as a volunteer organisation for many years, TGEU established itself as legitimate voice of the trans community in Europe.

In 2008 TGEU acquired their first independent project-based funding. However, it took until 2009 to hire first project staff (to implement the TvT project). In 2012 the General Assembly held in Dublin decided to move the seat of the organisation to Berlin, a process that was finalised with the closing of the Austrian association at the General Assembly held in Budapest in 2014.

In 2016, TGEU’s Sex Work Policy was enthusiastically acclaimed and adopted by the General Assembly at the European Transgender Council in Bologna, Italy. Thanks to the efforts of trans activists in Central Asia, the General Assembly voted to broaden the mandate TGEU to also include Central Asia at the European Transgender Council 2018 in Antwerp, Belgium.

Today, 2021, TGEU has an office in Berlin, Germany, as well as a team of ten members of staff and a Board. With over 150 member organisations in almost 50 different countries, TGEU continues to combine advocacy work in Europe and Central Asia with community work in partnership with member groups.

Vision
TGEU envisions a world free from discrimination where gender diversity is celebrated, where trans people are valued, and where trans movements are self-aware, intersectional, and evolving to meet the needs of a diverse and resilient community.

Mission
TGEU’s mission is to strengthen the rights and wellbeing of all trans people in Europe and Central Asia. TGEU strives to represent the diverse needs of members within human rights mechanisms, build the capacity and skills of members to meet the needs of local communities, and develop intersectional and decolonised programmes to build more resilient and connected trans movements.

Research

Trans Murder Monitoring
The Trans Murder Monitoring (TMM) project systematically monitors, collects, and analyses reports of homicides of trans and gender-diverse people worldwide. The Trans Murder Monitoring project started in April 2009 as a cooperation between Transgender Europe (TGEU) and the academic online magazine Liminalis – A Journal for Sex/Gender Emancipation and Resistance. With the involvement of the editorial team of Liminalis, the TMM became a pilot project of Transgender Europe's "Transrespect versus Transphobia Worldwide" research project in September 2009.

The latest TMM update (2020) revealed a total of 350 trans and gender-diverse people registered murdered between 1 October 2019 and 30 September 2020, representing a 6% increase in reported murders from the 2019 update. The majority of the murders occurred in Brazil (152), Mexico (57), and the United States (28), adding up to a total of 3664 reported cases in 75 countries and territories worldwide between 1 January 2008 and 30 September 2020.

Trans Rights Index & Maps 
The Trans Rights Index & Maps are launched in May each year and reflect the current legal situation in countries throughout Europe and Central Asia. The 2020 edition of the Index provides detailed information on the legal situation of all 47 Council of Europe member States and five Central Asian countries. It covers a total of 30 indicators in six legal categories: legal gender recognition, asylum, bias-motivated speech and violence, non-discrimination, health, and family. The Maps focus specifically on two legal gender recognition (LGR) indicators that stigmatise and violate the rights of trans people: forced sterilisation and mandatory mental health diagnosis. Each of the respective maps illustrates which countries demand these problematic LGR requirements.

Cooperations and alliances
 International Lesbian, Gay, Bisexual, Trans and Intersex Association (ILGA);
 Global Action for Trans Equality (GATE);
ILGA-Europe;
Asia Pacific Transgender Network (APTN);
International Lesbian, Gay, Bisexual, Transgender, Queer & Intersex Youth and Student Organisation (IGLYO);
Transgender Network Netherland (TNN);
 International Campaign Stop Trans Pathologization (STP);
 International Day Against Homophobia and Transphobia (IDAHOT).

See also
 LGBT rights in Europe
 LGBT rights in the European Union
 List of transgender-rights organizations
 Transgender rights in Germany
 Transgender rights movement

References

External links
 Official website
 Transrespect versus Transphobia Worldwide research project, TvT

2005 establishments in Europe
Transgender in Europe
Transgender organizations
International LGBT organizations